Reno is a 1923 American silent melodrama film produced and distributed by Goldwyn Pictures and was written and directed by Rupert Hughes. Hughes provided his own story to the film which followed his recently rediscovered Souls for Sale. The film stars Helene Chadwick and Lew Cody.

Cast

Preservation
A print is preserved by Metro-Goldwyn-Mayer.

References

External links

Still with Carmel Myers and Lew Cody at silenthollywood.com
Still with Helene Chadwick and George Walsh at abcdvdvideo
Still with Carmel Myers and Boyce Combe at fineartamerica.com

1923 films
1923 drama films
Silent American drama films
American silent feature films
American black-and-white films
Goldwyn Pictures films
Melodrama films
Films directed by Rupert Hughes
Films with screenplays by Rupert Hughes
1920s American films